Yudnamutana is an historic mining valley in the Northern Flinders Ranges, located at Mount Freeling, North West of Arkaroola on the edge of the wilderness sanctuary. It is accessible by four-wheel drive from the south. Ancient mining sites give the opportunity for ecologically responsible bush camping, but no supplies are available. Walks across the crests of the mountains deliver splendid views over the Flinders Ranges into the plains of the outback. The northern pass hosts black rocks of magnetite.

History

Indigenous people
This area was inhabited by the Adnyamathanha tribe, of Indigenous Australians prior to Europeans.  They were Stone Age hunter-gatherers and inhabited much of the area to the south.

European settlement 
This area was first settled by pastoralists in the 1850s but prospectors followed shortly after, hoping for another Burra style deposit. A copper deposit was found, in 1859, by A Frost and H Gleeson.
 Yudnamutana was the site of an early South Australia copper mine. First mined in 1862, it reached fame in Adelaide shortly after when a four tonne block of ore was paraded through the streets. A drought in 1869 forced the closure of the mine because not enough water was available for animals used for transport at the mine.

Another attempt was made at mining the site at the start of the 20th century, though this also closed by 1912. Transport was easier this time but ore still had to be drayed to the train line at Farina, 100 km away. All that remains of this settlement are two large boilers, some mine shafts,  some dugouts and the cemetery.

Notes

External links
 History of Yudnamutana
 Picture Australia

Ghost towns in South Australia
Flinders Ranges
Far North (South Australia)
1862 establishments in Australia